The 1909 Copa del Rey Final was the 7th final of the Spanish cup competition, the Copa del Rey. The final was played at Campo de O'Donnell in Madrid on 8 April 1909. The match was won by Club Ciclista, who beat Español de Madrid 3–1. The Ciclista goals were scored by George McGuinness, Charles Simmons and Miguel Sena, with José Giralt reducing the deficit for Español de Madrid late on.

The final was played under a heavy downpour and with low temperatures. The match was tough and although Español de Madrid took the initiative, their attack collided again and again with the San Sebastian defense that did take advantage of the opportunities they enjoyed. After 90 minutes of unsuccessful domination from Español de Madrid (they even missed a penalty for a handball in the area), the referee blew the whistle for the end of the match with a result of 3 to 1 for San Sebastián Cycling Club, which was proclaimed Champion of Spain for the first time.

Club Ciclista de San Sebastián are the predecessors of Real Sociedad. After winning the cup trophy, on 7 September 1909 the players of Club Ciclista founded a new in club in San Sebastián, called Vasconia, later they changed the name in Real Sociedad.

The trophy of the 1909 Copa del Rey is in the Real Sociedad museum.

Details

References

External links
linguasport.com
IFFHS.de
RSSSF.com

1909
1908–09 in Spanish football
Club Ciclista matches
Club Español de Madrid matches